Master Man is a fictional character created during the 1930s to 1940s period historians and fans called the Golden Age of Comic Books. A superhero, the character's exact creator is uncertain: his first story, in Fawcett Comics' Master Comics #1 (March 1940), was drawn by Newt Alfred, but that issue's cover was drawn by Harry Fiske. The leader character in the anthology Master Comics, he was described as:

Master Man could not fly but was super strong and could run at extreme speeds, faster than an automobile. The series lasted six issues, due to a lawsuit threat from National Comics (later DC Comics), the publishers of the Superman series, which had been emboldened by a recent legal victory against a similar character called Wonder Man.

Fawcett would discontinue its comic publishing in 1953. In the 1970s DC Comics licensed Fawcett's Captain Marvel character, and would eventually become the intellectual property owners of Fawcett's superhero characters.

This character has no connection to the Marvel Comics villain, a Nazi called Master Man in the 1970s comic-book series  The Invaders, the Master Man from Quality Comics who antagonized Kid Eternity, or the Nazi superhuman in the 2000 AD stories about Zenith.

Notes

External links
Master Man at the Grand Comics Database
Nevins, Jess. Master Man at The Golden Age Heroes Directory: M
Master Man at An International Catalogue of Superheroes
Master Comics #1 (download) at Golden Age Comics

American superheroes
1940 comics debuts
1940 comics endings
Superhero comics
Male superheroes
Comics characters who can move at superhuman speeds
Comics characters with superhuman strength
Comics characters introduced in 1940
Fawcett Comics superheroes
Golden Age superheroes